Alina Popa (born October 12, 1978) is a Romanian-born professional female bodybuilder currently living in the USA.

Early life and education
Popa grew up Brăila, Romania. From the age of 12, she competed in track and field, initially to lose weight. In college, she studied English and Romanian for four years, majoring in the former with a teaching degree.

Bodybuilding career

Amateur
At the age of 19, she chanced upon a gym in her hometown, where she encountered a young woman preparing for the National Junior Championships. This inspired Popa to begin a training regimen of her own. She would continue lifting for the next two years before a trainer suggested she train competitively.

Popa entered her first local competition in 2000, a regional cup in which she placed second. Later that same year, she placed third in her division at the National Championships. In 2003, upon reaching a weight of  she began competing in the heavyweight bracket, representing her country until 2005. In 2006, she relocated to Switzerland, close to Zurich, and has competed for her adopted country as an amateur. She received her IFBB pro card in 2008 after winning the overall and heavyweight at the 2008 IFBB Worlds Santa Susanna. As a pro athlete, she represents her native country, Romania.

Professional
Popa competed in her first Ms. International in 2010 and her first Ms. Olympia in 2011. With the exception of the 2010 Ms. International, every IFBB professional bodybuilding competition Popa has attended has found her placing within the top five. At the 2013 and 2014 Ms. Olympia competitions, she finished second behind Iris Kyle. To date, this is her second highest placing. Her trainer is bodybuilder Dylan Armbrust, owner of Armbrust Pro Gym and husband of professional bodybuilder Heather Policky Armbrust.

Due to injuries, Popa did not participate in the 2015 Rising Phoenix World Championships, but returned to competition in 2016.

Popa went on to win both the 2018 IFBB Muscle Vodka Tampa Pro and the 2018 Rising Phoenix World Championships.

Contest history
2000 Regional Cup - 2nd (HW)
2000 IFBB National Championship - 3rd (HW)
2003 IFBB National Championship - 1st (MW)
2004 IFBB European Championship - 2nd (HW)
2005 Mixed Pairs European Championship - 2nd
2005 Women's European Championship - 5th
2006 Grand Prix Due Torri - 1st
2007 NABBA Miss Universe - 1st (Miss Physique class)
2008 IFBB Worlds Santa Susanna - 1st (Overall and HW)
2010 IFBB Ms. International - 8th
2011 IFBB Ms. International - 3rd
2011 IFBB Ms. Olympia - 5th
2012 IFBB Ms. International - 3rd
2012 IFBB Ms. Olympia - 4th
2013 IFBB Ms. Olympia - 2nd
2014 IFBB Ms. Olympia - 2nd
 2016 WOS Rising Phoenix World Championships - 3rd
2018 IFBB Muscle Vodka Tampa Pro - 1st
2018 Rising Phoenix World Championships - 1st

Statistics

Bodyweight and bodyfat

 2008 - In Season:  Off-Season:

Measurements
Biceps

 2008 - In Season:  Off-Season: 

Back

 2008 - 

Thighs

 2008 - In Season:  Off-Season: 

Calves

 2008 -

Best lifts (for reps)
Squat -  x 4-6 reps
Bench press -  x 4-6 reps
Bicep curls -  each arm x 3 reps
Deadlift -  x 8 reps

Personal life
Popa currently lives in Arvada, Colorado, and she is divorced. As of September 11, 2013, Popa started working at Armbrust Pro Gym in Wheat Ridge, Colorado, as a personal trainer, and also poses as a freelance fitness model.

References

External links
Official web site
AMG Lite
Twitter account

1978 births
Living people
People from Arvada, Colorado
People from Lakewood, Colorado
Professional bodybuilders
Romanian expatriate sportspeople in Switzerland
Romanian expatriate sportspeople in the United States
Romanian female bodybuilders
Sportspeople from Brăila
Sportspeople from Colorado
Sportspeople from Denver
Sportspeople from Zürich
Swiss expatriate sportspeople in the United States
Swiss female bodybuilders